Gabor Varga (15 March 1961  - 10 September 2006) was a Swedish aviator who was in the Guinness Book of Records for having performed 256 aerobatic loops in an hour.

On 10 September 2006, Varga was performing during the Aero GP air show over Marsamxett Harbour off Valletta, Malta, in his Yakovlev Yak-55 when he was killed instantly in a mid-air collision with the Extra EA-200 of Irish pilot Eddie Goggins. Groggins survived with minor injuries.

References

External links
YouTube video of the collision

1961 births
2006 deaths
Aerobatic pilots
Aviators killed in aviation accidents or incidents
Filmed deaths in motorsport
Swedish aviators
Victims of aviation accidents or incidents in Malta
Victims of aviation accidents or incidents in 2006